Seth Wallace Cobb (December 5, 1838 – May 22, 1909) was a U.S. Representative from Missouri.

Biography
Born near Petersburg, Virginia, Cobb attended the common schools. He joined a volunteer company from his native county in 1861 and served throughout the Civil War in the Army of Northern Virginia.
After the war, he moved to St. Louis, Missouri in 1867 and was employed as a clerk in a grain commission house. By 1870, Cobb opened his own grain business. Active in the local business community, he served as president of the Merchants' Exchange in 1886, and as president of the corporation which built the Merchants' Bridge across the Mississippi River.

Seth Cobb was married to socialite Zoe Cynthian Desloge, daughter of Firmin Rene Desloge. The marriage produced one child, a daughter named Josephine.

Cobb was elected as a Democrat to the Fifty-second, Fifty-third, and Fifty-fourth Congresses (March 4, 1891 – March 3, 1897). He was not a candidate for renomination in 1896, and he resumed the grain commission business in St. Louis. In 1904, he served as vice president of the Louisiana Purchase Exposition at St. Louis.

Cobb died in St. Louis, Missouri, May 22, 1909, and was interred in Calvary Cemetery.

Notes

References

1838 births
1909 deaths
Politicians from Petersburg, Virginia
Confederate States Army personnel
Democratic Party members of the United States House of Representatives from Missouri
19th-century American politicians